The State Central Navy Testing Range (Gosudarstvennyj central'nyj morskoj poligon) at Nyonoksa is the main rocket launching site of the Soviet Navy and later the Russian Navy.

History
It was established in 1954. 

Since 1965 numerous rockets of the types R-27, R-29, R-39 Rif and R-39M were launched from Nyonoksa.

Accidents
On 15 December 2015, an accident during a missile launch test resulted in a block of flats in the village being hit by part of a rocket.

On 8 August 2019 an explosion caused the Nyonoksa radiation accident with several scientists being killed. The incident might be linked to the development of the nuclear-powered cruise missile 9M730 Burevestnik, also known by its NATO reporting name as the SSC-X-9 Skyfall.

References 

Installations of the Russian Navy
Weapons test sites
Installations of the Soviet Navy
Buildings and structures in Arkhangelsk Oblast
1954 establishments in the Soviet Union